Caio Narcio Rodrigues da Silveira (21 August 1986 – 16 August 2020), often simply known as Caio Narcio, was a Brazilian politician and a social scientist. Born in Minas Gerais, he served as a state representative from 2015 to 2019.

Personal life
The son of politicians Narcio Rodrigues and Ana Cássia, Narcio graduated from the Pontifical Catholic University of Minas Gerais.

Political career
Narcio voted in favor of the impeachment motion of then-president Dilma Rousseff. Narcio would vote in favor of a similar corruption investigation into Rousseff's successor Michel Temer, and he voted in favor of the 2017 Brazilian labor reforms.

Health and death
In 2018, Narcio developed meningoencephalitis. On 2 July 2020, Narcio was taken to a hospital in São Paulo with a high fever, and subsequently tested positive for COVID-19 during the COVID-19 pandemic in Brazil. He died from complications of the virus exacerbated by meningoencephalitis on 16 August 2020, less than a week before his 34th birthday.

References

1986 births
2020 deaths
People from Uberlândia
Brazilian social scientists
Brazilian Social Democracy Party politicians
Members of the Chamber of Deputies (Brazil) from Minas Gerais
Deaths from the COVID-19 pandemic in São Paulo (state)